Dagadaga Bonarua Island is an island separating East Channel and China Strait, just south of Milne Bay, in Milne Bay Province, Papua New Guinea.

Administration 
The island belongs to Sidudu Ward on Sariba Island. which belong to Bwanabwana Rural Local Level Government Area LLG, Samarai-Murua District, which are in Milne Bay Province.

History 
In 1966, a South sea pearls farm established on the island. however, due to financial difficulties, it was closed in 1999.

Geography 
The island is part of the Sariba group, itself a part of Samarai Islands of the Louisiade Archipelago.

Demographics 
After the pearl farm was closed, a caretaker lived on the island until he died in 2002. Since, the island is abandoned.

References

Islands of Milne Bay Province
Louisiade Archipelago